Paratorna schintlmeisteri is a species of moth of the family Tortricidae. It is found in the Philippines (Luzon).

The wingspan is about 14–16 mm. The ground colour of the forewings is cream, in the basal half mixed with grey in the dorsal area, with dark grey towards the costa and with pink in the posterior portion. The costa is rust brown, suffused with grey in the anterior half and marked with black spots. There is an arched brown line from the mid-costa to the tornus, followed by an ochreous area suffused with grey. The hindwings are pale white grey and grey on the margins.

References

Moths described in 1991
Tortricini
Moths of the Philippines
Taxa named by Józef Razowski